Jean-Baptiste Kouame, also known by the stage name Free School, is an American songwriter and record producer. He was featured in "Spaceship" by Benny Benassi with Kelis and apl.de.ap from The Black Eyed Peas.

Production credits

Writing credits

References

American record producers
Living people
Year of birth missing (living people)